Coris is a genus of wrasses, collectively known as the rainbow wrasses, found in the Atlantic, Indian, and Pacific Oceans.

Species
The 27 currently recognized species in this genus are:
 Coris atlantica  Günther, 1862
 Coris auricularis  (Valenciennes, 1839) (western king wrasse)
 Coris aurilineata  J. E. Randall & Kuiter, 1982 (gold-lined coris)
 Coris aygula  Lacépède, 1801 (clown coris)
 Coris ballieui  Vaillant & Sauvage, 1875
 Coris batuensis  (Bleeker, 1856) (Batu coris)
 Coris bulbifrons  J. E. Randall & Kuiter, 1982 (doubleheader)
 Coris caudimacula  (Quoy & Gaimard, 1834) (spottail coris)
 Coris centralis  J. E. Randall, 1999
 Coris cuvieri  (E. T. Bennett, 1831)

 Coris debueni  J. E. Randall, 1999 (De Buen's coris)
 Coris dorsomacula  Fowler, 1908 (pale-barred coris)
 Coris flavovittata  (E. T. Bennett, 1828) (yellowstripe coris)
 Coris formosa  (J. W. Bennett, 1830) (queen coris)
 Coris gaimard  (Quoy & Gaimard, 1824) (African coris)
 Coris hewetti  J. E. Randall, 1999
 Coris julis  (Linnaeus, 1758) (Mediterranean rainbow wrasse)
 Coris latifasciata  J. E. Randall, 2013
 Coris marquesensis  J. E. Randall, 1999
 Coris musume  (D. S. Jordan & Snyder, 1904)
 Coris nigrotaenia  Mee & Hare, 1995 (blackbar coris)
 Coris picta  (Bloch & J. G. Schneider, 1801) (comb wrasse)
 Coris pictoides  J. E. Randall & Kuiter, 1982 (blackstripe coris)
 Coris roseoviridis  J. E. Randall, 1999
 Coris sandeyeri  (Hector, 1884) (Sandager's wrasse)
 Coris variegata  (Rüppell, 1835) (dapple coris)
 Coris venusta  Vaillant & Sauvage, 1875 (elegant coris)

References

 
Labridae
Marine fish genera
Taxa named by Bernard Germain de Lacépède